Shenyang Aeroengine Research Institute (or 606 Institute) is a Chinese aeroengine design institute of the Aero Engine Corporation of China. In the past, it has partnered with Shenyang Aircraft Corporation in developing military aircraft engines.

Products
 Turbofan WS-10, Taihang
 Turbojet WP-14, Kunlun

Aircraft engine manufacturers of China
Companies with year of establishment missing
Aerospace research institutes
Aircraft manufacturers of China